This article is a list of the keepers and rangers of Richmond Park, initially of the "New Park" formed in 1625 by Charles I.

Keepers
1637–1649 Jerome Weston, 2nd Earl of Portland

Rangers
1660–1673  Sir Lionel Tollemache and his wife Elizabeth, Countess of Dysart (Elizabeth alone in her own right after Lionel's death in 1669)
1673–1682  John Maitland, 1st Duke of Lauderdale, Elizabeth's second husband
1683–1711 Laurence Hyde, 1st Earl of Rochester
1711–1727 Henry Hyde, 2nd Earl of Rochester, the 1st Earl's son
1727–1751  Robert Walpole, 2nd Earl of Orford, son of Sir Robert Walpole, British Prime Minister 
1751–1761  Princess Amelia, daughter of George II
1761–1792  John Stuart, 3rd Earl of Bute, tutor and prime minister to George III
1792–1814  George III
1814–1835  Princess Elizabeth, George III's daughter
1835–1850  Prince Adolphus, Duke of Cambridge, George III's son
1850–1857  Princess Mary, Duchess of Gloucester and Edinburgh, George III's daughter
1857–1904  George, 2nd Duke of Cambridge, Adolphus's son

Deputy Rangers

before 1761–1781 Sidney Meadows
?–1781 Philip Meadows
1781–1800 Leonard Smelt
1813–? Lord Sidmouth

Since 1904 the park has been managed by central government and is currently the responsibility of The Royal Parks.

See also
Park ranger

Sources
Rabbitts, Paul A (2014). Richmond Park: From Medieval Pasture to Royal Park. Amberley Publishing. , pp. 22–24

Richmond Park
Keepers and rangers